The  Assistant Chief of the Naval Staff (Aviation, Amphibious Capability & Carriers) formerly the Assistant Chief of the Naval Staff (Aviation and Carrier Strike) is a senior Royal Navy appointment responsible for naval aviation. The post is also the successor to the Royal Navy's Flag Officer for naval aviation in the British Isles, established since 1939.

Flag Officer, Naval Air Stations
The post of Flag Officer Naval Air Stations was established in May 1939 to provide land based support for the Fleet Air Arm, then being transferred from the Royal Air Force to the Royal Navy.

 Rear Admiral Richard Bell-Davies: 24 May 1939 – 30 September 1941
 Rear Admiral Clement Moody: 30 September 1941 – April 1943
 Vice Admiral Cloudesley Robinson: April 1943 – April 1945

Flag Officer, Air, Home
In May 1945 the FONAS post was re-styled Flag Officer Air Home.

In September 1945 the post of Flag Officer, Flying Training was created, to be followed by Flag Officer, Ground Training and Rear-Admiral, Reserve Aircraft (an Equipment Branch post) in January 1949. The Reserve Aircraft post was disestablished in 1956 and the Ground Training post in 1957.

Flag Officer, Air, Home flew his flag from RNAS Lee-on-Solent (HMS Daedalus); the post existed until 1963. He was responsible for shore-based air command working up squadrons to operational effectiveness, and after an Operational Readiness Inspection, delivering them to the Fleet.

Vice-Admiral Sir Cloudesley Robinson: May 1945 (then retired)
Vice-Admiral Denis Boyd: June 1945 – April 1946 
Rear-Admiral Geoffrey N. Oliver: April–September 1946 
Vice-Admiral Sir Thomas H. Troubridge: September 1946 – November 1947 
Admiral Sir Reginald Portal: November 1947 – March 1951 
Vice-Admiral Sir Charles Lambe: March 1951 – January 1953     
Vice-Admiral Sir John Eccles: January 1953 – June 1955 
Vice-Admiral Sir Caspar John: June 1955 – March 1957 
Admiral Sir Walter Couchman: March 1957 – January 1960 
Admiral Sir Deric Holland-Martin: January 1960 – May 1961 
Vice-Admiral Desmond Dreyer: May 1961 – October 1962 
Vice-Admiral Sir John Hamilton: October 1962 – January 1964

Flag Officer, Naval Air Command 
This post was created on 30 September 1963 as renaming of Flag Officer Air, Home, at the time a Vice-Admiral's command.

In November 1970 the post of Flag Officer, Flying Training was disestablished. Sir John Treacher, who was in post from June 1972, wrote in Life at Full Throttle that '..the tasks undertaken by the old Flying Training Command and Flag Officer Air (Home) had now been taken over by the Flag Officer Naval Air Command to form a single entity and the headquarters had been moved from Lee-on-Solent to the Royal Naval Air Station at Yeovilton.' In April 2010 the post was renamed Assistant Chief of the Naval Staff (Carriers & Aviation).

Vice-Admiral Sir Richard M. Smeeton:    January 1964 – October 1965 
Vice-Admiral Sir Donald C.E.F. Gibson:  October 1965 – October 1968 
Vice-Admiral Sir H. Richard B. Janvrin: October 1968 – November 1970 
Vice-Admiral Michael F. Fell:           November 1970 – June 1972 
Vice-Admiral John D. Treacher:      June 1972 – August 1973
Vice-Admiral Sir Peter M. Austin:       August 1973 – August 1976 
Rear-Admiral John O. Roberts:           August 1976 – February 1978 
Vice-Admiral Sir A. Desmond Cassidi:   February 1978 – June 1979 
Rear-Admiral Edward R. Anson:          June 1979 – May 1982 
Vice-Admiral Sir John Cox:        May 1982 – September 1983 
Vice-Admiral Sir Derek Reffell:     September 1983 – September 1984 
Rear-Admiral Linley Middleton:      September 1984 – February 1987 
Rear-Admiral Roger Dimmock:         February 1987 – August 1988 
Rear-Admiral Michael Layard:      August 1988 – December 1990 
Rear-Admiral Colin H.D. Cooke-Priest:  December 1990 – February 1993 
Rear-Admiral Ian Garnett:         February 1993 – June 1995 
Rear-Admiral Terence W. Loughran:      June 1995 – October 1998 
Rear-Admiral Iain Henderson:  October 1998 – July 2001 - Flag Officer, Maritime Aviation
Rear-Admiral Scott Lidbetter:          July 2001 – 2003 
Rear-Admiral Simon B. Charlier:        September 2008 – April 2010

Assistant Chief of the Naval Staff (Aviation, Amphibious Capability & Carriers) 
In 2012, this post's responsibilities were officially described as '..ACNS(A&C) is responsible for delivering aviation Force Elements at Readiness in accordance with the RN plan and arising, contingent events. This includes all RN fixed and rotary wing assets, the two Naval Air Stations and the generation of aircraft carriers and carrier capability. He is the lead, on behalf of the Fleet Commander, for the development of the future Carrier Strike capability. As the Navy's Aviation Operational Duty Holder, he is personally, legally accountable for the safe execution of maritime aviation by all Royal Navy units, including aircraft, ships and submarines. ACNS(A&CS) is also Rear Admiral Fleet Air Arm in which role, as a Head of a Naval Fighting Arm, he is responsible for the professional effectiveness, ethos and spirit of all Fleet Air Arm personnel.' It has been renamed as Assistant Chief of Naval Staff (Aviation, Amphibious Capability & Carriers) (ACNS(A&C)) and Rear-Admiral Fleet Air Arm around 2019.

Today the main air station that ACNS (A&CS) has responsibility for is RNAS Yeovilton (HMS Heron).

Rear-Admiral Thomas A. Cunningham: April 2010 – September 2012
Rear-Admiral Russ Harding: September 2012 – May 2015
Rear-Admiral Keith E. Blount: May 2015 – February 2019
Rear-Admiral Martin J. Connell: February 2019–January 2022

References

External links
Royal Navy – Senior Appointments (p. 86)

A